Trams in Manchester may refer to: 
Manchester Corporation Tramways (1901–1949)
Manchester Metrolink (1992–)